Santiago Pérez Alonso (born January 12, 1972 in Vigo, Pontevedra) is a male race walker from Spain.

Achievements

References

sports-reference

1972 births
Living people
Spanish male racewalkers
Athletes (track and field) at the 2004 Summer Olympics
Athletes (track and field) at the 2008 Summer Olympics
Olympic athletes of Spain